Dorothy Looks for Love (French: Dorothée cherche l'amour) is a 1945 French drama film directed by Edmond T. Gréville and starring Suzy Carrier, Claude Dauphin and Jules Berry.

The film's sets were designed by the art director Jean Douarinou.

Cast
 Suzy Carrier as Dorothée 
 Claude Dauphin as Robert
 Jules Berry as M. Pascal 
 Henri Guisol as André Vincent 
 Samson Fainsilber as Sylvain 
 Luce Feyrer
 Robert Arnoux
 Maurice Maillot
 Gaston Orbal
 Félix Oudart

References

Bibliography 
 Philippe Rège. Encyclopedia of French Film Directors, Volume 1. Scarecrow Press, 2009.

External links 
 

1945 films
1945 comedy films
French comedy films
1940s French-language films
Films directed by Edmond T. Gréville
1940s French films